Allokutzneria albata is a bacterium from the genus Allokutzneria which has been isolated from soil from the Mindanao Island on the Philippines. Allokutzneria albata produces the antiviral antibiotics cycloviracin B1 and cycloviracin B2.

References

Pseudonocardiales
Bacteria described in 1993